This is a list of the films directed by Luis Buñuel.

Film

Features

Shorts

Other work 
Writing and producing

Assistance and supervision

Awards

1950s 
Los Olvidados

 Cannes Film Festival – Best Director
 Ariel Award – Golden Ariel
 Ariel Award - Silver Ariel – Mejor Dirección
 Ariel Award - Silver Ariel – Mejor Adaptación (with Luis Alcoriza)
 Ariel Award - Silver Ariel – Mejor Argumento Original (with Luis Alcoriza)

Mexican Bus Ride

 Cannes Film Festival – Official Selection
 Ariel Award nominee – Golden Ariel
 Ariel Award nominee - Silver Ariel – Mejor Dirección

Robinson Crusoe

 Ariel Award – Golden Ariel
 Ariel Award -Silver Ariel – Mejor Dirección
 Ariel Award -Silver Ariel – Mejor Adaptación
 Oscar nominee – Best Actor (Dan O'Herlihy)

Rehearsal for a Crime (aka The Criminal Life of Archibaldo de la Cruz) Ariel Award nominee – Golden Ariel
 Ariel Award nominee - Silver Ariel – Mejor Dirección
 Ariel Award nominee - Silver Ariel – Mejor Adaptación (with Eduardo Ugarte)Nazarín

 Cannes Film Festival – International Prize
 Bodil Award – Best Non-European Film (Bedste ikke-europæiske film)

1960s 
The Young One

 Cannes Film Festival – Special Mention

Viridiana

 Cannes Film Festival – Palme d'Or

The Exterminating Angel

 Cannes Film Festival – FIPRESCI Prize
 Bodil Award – Best Non-European Film (Bedste ikke-europæiske film)

Diary of a Chambermaid

 Italian National Syndicate of Film Journalists – Nastro d'Argento nominee for Best Foreign Director
 Karlovy Vary International Film Festival – Best Actress (Jeanne Moreau)

Simon of the Desert

 Venice Film Festival  Grand Jury Prize

Belle de Jour

 Venice Film Festival – Golden Lion 
 Venice Film Festival – Pasinetti Award
 Bodil Award – Best European Film (Bedste europæiske film) 
 French Syndicate of Cinema Critics Award – Best Film  
 New York Film Critics Circle Awards – Third place – Best Foreign Language Film 
 French Syndicate of Cinema Critics – Prix Méliès
 BAFTA Award nominee for Best Actress (Catherine Deneuve)

The Milky Way

 Berlin International Film Festival – Interfilm Award
 Italian National Syndicate of Film Journalists – Nastro d'Argento nominee for Best Foreign Director

1970s 
Tristana

 Oscar Nominee – Best Foreign Language Film
 Cinema Writers Circle Award – Mejor Director
 National Society of Film Critics Award nominee – Best Director
 Sant Jordi Award – Best Film (Mejor Película Española)
 Fotogramas de Plata – Best Spanish Movie Performer (Fernando Rey)
 Fotogramas de Plata nominee – Best Spanish Movie Performer (Lola Gaos)

The Discreet Charm of the Bourgeoisie

 Oscar Winner – Best Foreign Language Film
 Oscar Nominee – Best Original Screenplay
 BAFTA Film Award – Best Screenplay (with Jean-Claude Carrière)
 BAFTA Film Award nominee – Best Direction 
 BAFTA Film Award nominee – Best Soundtrack (with Guy Villette)
 French Syndicate of Cinema Critics – Prix Méliès
 Golden Globe Award nominee – Best Foreign-Language Foreign Film
 Italian National Syndicate of Film Journalists – Nastro d'Argento nominee for Best Foreign Director
 National Society of Film Critics Award – Best Director
 National Society of Film Critics Award nominee – Best Screenplay (with Jean-Claude Carrière)
 New York Film Critics Circle Award nominee – Best Director
 New York Film Critics Circle Award nominee – Best Screenplay (with Jean-Claude Carrière)

The Phantom of Liberty

 Italian National Syndicate of Film Journalists – Nastro d'Argento for Best Foreign Director
 National Board of Review – Top Foreign Films

That Obscure Object of Desire

 Oscar Nominee – Best Foreign Language Film 
 Oscar Nominee – Best Adapted Screenplay
 Cinema Writers Circle Award – Mejor Director
 César Award nominee for Best Director
 César Award nominee for Best Screenplay, Original or Adaptation (with Jean-Claude Carrière)
 Golden Globe Award nominee – Best Foreign-Language Foreign Film
 Los Angeles Film Critics Association Award – Best Foreign Language Film
 National Board of Review Award – Best Director
 National Society of Film Critics Award – Best Director
 New York Film Critics Circle Award nominee – Best Director

References

Buñuel, Luis